Aşağı Kəldək (also, Ashaga Kel’dek, Ashagy Kel’dek, and Ash-Kel’dek) is a village in the Shaki Rayon of Azerbaijan.  The village forms part of the municipality of Baş Kəldək.

References 

Populated places in Shaki District